Murbeckiella is a genus of 5 species of flowering plants in the mustard family Brassicaceae. The species of the genus are native to mountainous areas in Southern Europe, the Caucasus and Northwest Africa.

They are native to France, Italy, Morocco, Portugal, Spain, Switzerland, Transcaucasia and Turkey.

The genus name of Murbeckiella is in honour of Svante Samuel Murbeck (1859–1946), a Swedish professor, botanist, pteridologist and explorer. 
It was first described and published in Bot. Not. 1939 on page 468 in 1939.

Species
Murbeckiella boryi (Boiss.) Rothm.: Iberian Peninsula (Portugal and Spain) and Morocco
Murbeckiella huetii (Boiss.) Rothm.: Eastern Turkey and Caucasus
Murbeckiella pinnatifida (Lam.) Rothm.: Pyrenees and the western and central Alps
Murbeckiella sousae Rothm.: Portugal
Murbeckiella zanonii (Ball) Rothm.: south and central France and Italy (Apennine Mountains)

References

Brassicaceae genera
Brassicaceae
Plants described in 1939
Flora of France
Flora of Italy
Flora of Morocco
Flora of Portugal
Flora of Spain
Flora of Switzerland
Flora of the Transcaucasus